Betty McCracken is a Canadian curler.

Teams

References

External links
 
 Betty McCracken – Curling Canada Stats Archive

Living people
Canadian women curlers
Curlers from Calgary
Canadian women's curling champions
Year of birth missing (living people)